In computer technology and telecommunications, the term offline refers to a lack of connectivity.

Offline may also refer to:
 OfflineTV, an online social entertainment group of content creators based in Los Angeles, California
 Offline (album), a 2014 album by Guano Apes
 Cyberstalker (film), a 2012 Canadian film also known as Offline
 Unfriended, a 2014 film whose working title was Offline

See also
 Airplane mode
Online (disambiguation)